Date Night is an Australian reality dating television show which premiered on the Nine Network on 13 February 2018.

Premise

The program follows a bunch of singles from the comfort of their lounge rooms, using a dating app with help from family and friends who comment on the pictures and profiles of fellow daters as they go to help them find the man/woman of their dreams, when they eventually select a person they will go on a date with them.

Series overview

Episodes

References

Nine Network original programming
Australian dating and relationship reality television series
2018 Australian television series debuts
Television series by Screentime